Guillermo "Guille" Rosas Alonso (born 17 May 2000) is a Spanish footballer who plays for Sporting de Gijón as a right back.

Club career
Born in Gijón, Asturias, Rosas joined Sporting de Gijón's Mareo in 2009, from Xeitosa CF. On 6 July 2018, while still a youth, he renewed his contract for three years.

Promoted to the reserves for the 2019–20 campaign, Rosas made his senior debut on 16 November 2019, starting in a 1–1 Segunda División B home draw against Celta de Vigo B. He scored his first goals on 15 December, netting a brace in a 6–0 home routing of SCR Peña Deportiva.

Rosas made his first team debut on 11 October 2020, coming on as a second-half substitute for Bogdan Milovanov in a 0–1 away loss against Real Oviedo, which was the 109th Asturian derby. The following 1 February, he renewed his contract until 2025 and was definitely promoted to the main squad, being assigned the number 2 jersey.

Career statistics

Club 

 As of 28 July 2021

References

External links

2000 births
Living people
Footballers from Gijón
Spanish footballers
Association football defenders
Segunda División players
Segunda División B players
Sporting de Gijón B players
Sporting de Gijón players
Spain youth international footballers
Spain under-21 international footballers